Gopal Das (Hindi, from Sanskrit गोपाल दास, Gopāla Dāsa), means servant of Gopal, and can refer to:

 Gopala Dasa, exponent of the Dvaita school of philosophy
 Gopaldas Ambaidas Desai, Indian independence activist
 Gopaldas Neeraj, poet
 Gaur Gopal Das, a Spiritual leader and motivational speaker of ISKCON order
 Gopaldas Shankarlal Agrawal, Maharashtra legislator
 Gopal Das Shrestha, Nepal journalist